Ziro-Hapoli is one of the 60 constituencies of Legislative Assembly of Arunachal Pradesh. Name of current MLA (August 2019) of this constituency is Tage Taki who successfully defeated his nearest rival Nani Ribia to win his consecutive tenure.
Ziro and Hapoli are one of the most literate towns in the Indian state of Arunachal Pradesh. Lower Subansiri is the name of the district that contains Ziro-Hapoli.

Members of the Legislative Assembly

Election results

2019

See also
List of constituencies of Arunachal Pradesh Legislative Assembly
Arunachal Pradesh Legislative Assembly

References

Villages in Lower Subansiri district
Assembly constituencies of Arunachal Pradesh